Multan International Airport  is an international airport located 4 km west of Multan, Pakistan. The airport is South Punjab's largest and busiest airport.  Multan International Airport offers flights throughout Pakistan, as well as direct flights to Bahrain, Oman, Qatar, Saudi Arabia, and the United Arab Emirates.

In March 2015, a new terminal building was formally inaugurated by the Prime Minister Emeritus of Pakistan Mian Muhammad Nawaz Sharif. Following the opening of the new terminal, passenger traffic soared from 384,571 in 2014–2015, to 904,865 in 2015–2016.

History

Early beginning 
Multan International Airport traces its origins to the British Empire, when the Royal Air Force used the open space to fly in and out of the region during 1919. The area was used for aircraft that were able to land on gravel and grass surfaces. In 1934, Imperial Airways started to use the airfield for civil aircraft flights since Multan was considered a strategic position in the Punjab province of India. It was not until 1938 that Imperial Airways started to operate regular flights out of Multan. The flight would originate in Lahore, then fly into Multan, where it would continue its journey to Jacobabad and then Karachi.

Following the independence of Pakistan from the British, Pak Air, a new airline to the dominion, started operations from Multan Airport. Multan Flying Club was also set up at the Airport within the same year. It was not until the birth of the national flag carrier, Pakistan International Airlines in 1957, that PIA started operations from Multan Airport using Douglas DC-3 aircraft. In 1963, due to growth of the number of flights and larger aircraft requirements, the runway, taxi-ways and aprons where carpeted using bitumen. A new control tower was constructed to meet the technological changes at that time. The terminal building was extended in 1977, which also allowed the airport to handle Boeing 720 aircraft. In 1980–1988, the airport runway was strengthened and re-carpeted for the arrival of the Airbus A300. It was not until 1999 that PIA and the private airline Aero Asia operated international flights from the airport. Flights began to destinations in the Middle East such as Dubai and Kuwait.

Recent development 

As the demand for air travel began to surge, the Pakistan Civil Aviation Authority decided to upgrade the facilities for the airport in 2005. Initially the runway was upgraded to handle Boeing 747-400 operations at a cost of Rs 720m and was completed within the same year. On 15 December 2006, Shaheen Air started four weekly flights from Karachi to Multan. The airport also reported an operating profit of Rs 1bn within that year.

It was in December 2007, that Director General CAA, Farooq Rehmatullah held a press conference that the terminal building would be expanded as well as airside facilities at a cost of Rs4.5bn. It was in April 2009 that the work started with the runway, taxi ways and apron so the airport could handle large aircraft. The ground breaking ceremony was held by the then PM Syed Yousaf Raza Gillani. Pakistan-based Engineering Consultants International Limited (ECIL) was awarded the contract to extend the runway and terminal building.

In January 2010, the Pakistan Pakistan Civil Aviation Authority decided that a brand new terminal with four jet bridges would be constructed instead of expanding the current terminal. In June 2010, PM Yousaf Raza Gillani carried out the ground breaking ceremony for the terminal building and inaugurated the first PIA Boeing 747 Hajj flight on 28 October 2010.

During 2011, PIA introduced weekly flights for Jeddah and Medina. Flydubai announced thrice a week flights between Multan and Dubai with Boeing 737-800 from 14 March 2013 and became first foreign airline to operate from the airport post independence. Shaheen Air International restarted its daily operation from Karachi with Boeing 737 in February 2012 and Bhoja Air launched two weekly flights from Karachi with Boeing 737-200 in March 2012. Air Indus announced daily service for Multan – Karachi from 20 August 2013. Shaheen Air International started twice-a-week flight service for Multan – Dubai sector from 31 March 2013. Shaheen Air International announced two weekly flights between Multan and Medina from 1 June 2013. Pakistan International Airlines started two weekly direct flights for Jeddah and Medina from January 2014. Pakistan International Airlines announced weekly service for Multan – Sharjah sector from 30 March 2014. Shaheen Air International announced twice a week service for Jeddah - Multan sector from December 2014.

In March 2015, new terminal of Multan International Airport was formally inaugurated by PM Nawaz Sharif with former PM Yousaf Raza Gillani as well as several high-ranking officials. All operations have now shifted from the old terminal to the new one with flights increasing with more destinations and routes being opened up for the city of Multan. Keeping the international standards in view, a new air traffic control tower is constructed as well which is equipped with modern gadgets and navigation systems. A cargo complex of international standard has also been established with a capacity of 10,000 metric tonnes per year to host international cargo flights from Multan which will boost exports of fruits particularly mangos and vegetables. There are plans that this would further increase to 30,000 metric tonnes every year.

After the transfer of all operations to new terminal, Airblue announced it would start a twice a week flight service for Islamabad from 3 April 2015. Airblue also announced it would start twice a week service for Jeddah from 4 April 2015 and twice weekly service for Sharjah from 10 April 2015. Qatar Airways announced it would start 3 times a week service by A320 with 2 class seating for Doha - Multan sector from 1 August 2015 to get the facility for connections to USA and Europe. Air Arabia announced 4 weekly flights for Sharjah - Multan sector from 1 May 2015. Flydubai announced it would increase its 3 times weekly service to daily flights for Multan from 26 May 2015 as they got a good load for the sector. Air Arabia also got a successful response so they announced they would increase its service to daily flights for Multan from 31 May 2015. Emirates announced they were going to start 4 times a week flight operation by Boeing 777-300 with two-class seating to provide service for Dubai - Multan sector from 1 August 2015 which will facilitate the travelers to get connections for MENA Region, Far East, USA and Europe, this service will also provide the international cargo facility as every flight can carry up to 23 tonnes of cargo. Flydubai announced they would increase its frequency to 9 flights a week from 10 July 2015, two additional flights will provide the service on Wednesdays and Fridays to facilitate the travelers to/from Multan. After getting a successful business on Jeddah and Sharjah routes Airblue announced it would start twice a week flight service for Medina as well from 18 August 2015. Pakistan International Airlines opened more new routes from Multan, announcing the introduction of one weekly flight to Abu Dhabi by A320 from 26 October 2015 and one weekly flight for Muscat from 14 November 2015, also using the A320. Gulf Air expanded their operation in Pakistan, opening more routes so they announced four weekly flights by A320 for Bahrain - Multan sector from 14 December 2015 which will also provide connections to the USA. Shaheen Air International added Riyadh in its schedule as a new destination from Multan with twice a week service by using A320 from 6 April 2016. Airblue is increasing its operation for Multan and they announced it would start 4 weekly flights in between Karachi and Multan from 19 April 2016 by using A320. Pakistan International Airlines also started a new route in between Multan and Riyadh by providing 1 weekly flight from 21 April 2016. Taban Air of Iran started their seasonal service in between Mashhad and Multan from 17 May 2016. Air Indus operations have ceased and no longer services from Multan to Karachi anymore as of June 2016. Airblue started flying from Dubai to Multan sector with 2 weekly flights on 23 November 2016. Pakistan International Airlines also resumed their 2 weekly flights in between Multan and Quetta from 1 December 2016. Saudia started its operation for Multan from 1 April 2017 by adding 4 weekly flights in between Jeddah and Multan to get his share from the market. Shaheen Air International added one more destination to Multan by starting 1 weekly flight in between Multan and Muscat from 24 April 2017. Oman's Salam Air is adding Pakistan in their network and they announced it would start 3 weekly flights in between Muscat and Multan from 23 May 2017. Emirates Airline has ended operations to Multan on 26 October 2018 but it will carry on codeshare connections with Flydubai to the rest of the world.

Structure
Multan International Airport is fitted with all the essentials for domestic and international flights with the inauguration of the new terminal. The information below is correct as of April 2016.

Apron
 Four boarding jet bridges (Bay-1, 2, 3 and 4).
 Two wide-body and four narrow-body aircraft nose in parking available.
 Equipped with complete airfield lighting system (dimensions:  with  shoulders)

Runway
 ILS/DME VOR/NDB equipped 18/36 runway (dimensions:  with  shoulders on each side).
 Capable of handling up to Boeing 747-400, Boeing 777-300ER, and Airbus A340-600 aircraft.
 Instrument Landing System and Cat-I AFL System.
 High Intensity Lighting System.
 Parallel taxi-way running alongside Runway 18/36 for speedy exit and departure.
 Emergency alternative for Islamabad and Lahore.

Airport Services
 Pakistan State Oil provide fuel services to all airlines flying out of the airport. (Jet A-100)
 Fire fighting and Rescue Services. ICAO Category-9.
 FIDS systems located in the lounges and briefing concourses showing television programs and flight information.
 Airport Masjid located outside the terminal on the right hand side.
 Airport Medical Center located adjacent to CAA Masjid.
 Rent A Car facility and Metro Radio Cab Services.
 Custom and Immigration for international flights
 Airline Ticketing offices (Pakistan International Airlines, airblue, flydubai, Air Arabia, Emirates, Qatar Airways and Gulf Air).

Ground Handling Agents
Pakistan International Airlines.
airblue Ltd.
 Royal Airport Services (RAS).
 Gerry's DNATA

Cargo Complex
 Cargo/Freight Services provided by Pakistan International Airlines, booking can be made at PIA Booking Office located at Abdali Road or Airport Cargo Office.
 International Cargo/Freight Service provided by Emirates as their flights are capable of carrying up to 23 tonnes of cargo which helps local exporters to send their cargo to any of 78 countries in the world where Emirates operates.

Flying Schools/ Institutions
 Multan Flying Club

Additional
 Pakistan Meteorological Department
 Ramada Hotels counter
 Foreign Currency Exchange Counter

Airlines and destinations

Access

Car 
Multan International Airport is situated in the well populated area of cantonment and it is easily accessible through Airport Road by using Jamil Abad Road from any part of the city. There is a drop off lane at the front of the terminal as well as a wide car parking area which can accommodate more than 400 vehicles.

Taxi 
Metro Radio Cab Services provides service directly from the airport and their counter is situated at the landside of the terminal to book the cab.

Private Rent A Car facilities are also available at the airport.

Rickshaw 
There are also a number of traditional auto-rickshaws available at the airport parking area and entrance which are quite popular to travel short distances within the city.

Train 
Multan Cantonment railway station is the nearest railway station, less than 3 km away from the airport to get the railway connections to other parts of the country.

Statistics
The following table provides details of the major traffic flows out of Multan in terms of passenger numbers, aircraft movements, cargo, and mail. The results were collected by the Civil Aviation Authority of Pakistan:

Incidents and accidents
2000s

On 10 July 2006, a Fokker F-27 Friendship - 200 took off from Multan International Airport. Flight PK688 suffered engine problems soon after take-off, causing the pilot to lose control. The aircraft crashed in a nearby grassy field, causing it to catch fire on impact leaving all 45 passengers and crew dead.

See also
 List of airports in Pakistan
 Airlines of Pakistan
 Transport in Pakistan
 Pakistan Civil Aviation Authority

References

External links

Airport
Airports in Punjab, Pakistan
International airports in Pakistan
Airports established in 1934
Airport
1934 establishments in India